The 1910 United States House of Representatives elections in Florida for three seats in the 62nd Congress were held on November 8, 1910.

Background
The Democratic Party had dominated Florida's politics since the end of Reconstruction, with the last non-Democrat being elected to Congress from Florida in 1882.  At this time in Florida's history, the Democratic Party's main opponents in Florida were the Republicans and the Socialists.  In 1908, the Republicans had contested all three districts and the Socialists two.  This year, only one district had a Republican challenger, while all three had a Socialist challenger.

Election results

See also
United States House of Representatives elections, 1910

References

1910
Florida
United States House of Representatives